Egor Vladimirovich Kuimov (born 4 July 1999) is a Russian swimmer.

He competed in the 4×100 m medley relay event at the 2018 European Aquatics Championships, winning the silver medal.

References

1999 births
Living people
Russian male swimmers
Male butterfly swimmers
European Aquatics Championships medalists in swimming
Sportspeople from Kazan
Universiade gold medalists for Russia
Universiade medalists in swimming
Universiade silver medalists for Russia
Medalists at the 2019 Summer Universiade